Jerwood is a surname. Notable people with the surname include:

Colin Jerwood, the vocalist for the Anarcho-punk band Conflict
Frank Jerwood (1885–1971), British rower who competed in the 1908 Summer Olympics
John Jerwood (1918–1991), British philanthropist who funded the Jerwood Foundation

See also
Jerwood Award, financial award made to assist new writers of non-fiction in the UK
Jerwood Drawing Prize, United Kingdom award in contemporary drawing
Jerwood Foundation, major UK funder of arts, education and science
Jerwood Foundation's sculpture collection, Sculpture park
Jerwood Sculpture Prize
Jerwood Space, arts venue at Bankside on Union Street, Southwark, London